Charles William Adams (7 July 1840–29 October 1918) was a New Zealand surveyor, astronomer and public servant. He was born in Buckland, Tasmania, Australia on July 7th 1840.

His son, Charles Edward Adams, pursued a similar career as a university lecturer, surveyor, astronomer and seismologist. His daughter, Ella Spicer, and granddaughter, Peggy Spicer, were both painters.

References

New Zealand public servants
New Zealand surveyors
Australian emigrants to New Zealand
20th-century New Zealand astronomers
People from Tasmania
1840 births
1918 deaths
20th-century New Zealand public servants
19th-century New Zealand astronomers